Byers may refer to:

Places
 Byers, Colorado
 Byers Peak in Grand County, Colorado
 Byers, Kansas
 Byers, Pennsylvania
 Byers, Texas
 Byers Peninsula, Antarctica

Names of people
 Byers (surname)

See also
Breyers